Senator Latimer may refer to:

Members of the United States Senate
Asbury Latimer (1851–1908), U.S. Senator from South Carolina
Henry Latimer (politician) (1752–1819), U.S. Senator from Delaware

United States state senate members
Albert H. Latimer (1800–1877), Texas State Senate
George Latimer (New York politician) (born 1953), New York State Senate